Potato virus U (PVU) is a pathogenic plant virus discovered in Peru in 1983. PVU characteristically causes leaf malformation and necrotic spotting. Transmitted by mechanical inoculation—including seed-to-seed contact and grafting—PVU is also said to be transferred by nematodes of the genus Longidorus.

References

External links
Family Groups—The Baltimore Method

Nepoviruses
Viral plant pathogens and diseases